Sandon may refer to:

Places
 Sandon, British Columbia
 Sandon, Essex
 Sandon, Hertfordshire
 Sandon, Staffordshire
 Salt and Sandon railway station
 Sandon Hall, a 19th-century country mansion
 Sandon railway station
 Sandon, Victoria
 Sandon tornado, 1976
 Sandon County, New South Wales
 Sandon Point, New South Wales
 Sandon River, New South Wales
 Gotska Sandön, a Swedish island
 Jävre Sandön, a Swedish island

People

Surname
 Carel Sandon (born 1983), Zairean-born Italian professional lightweight boxer
 Flo Sandon's (1924–2006), Italian singer
 Frank Sandon (1890–1979), British swimmer who competed at the 1912 Summer Olympics
 Henry Sandon (born 1928), English antiques expert
 John Sandon (born 1959), English antiques expert
 Johnny Sandon (1941–1996), English singer
 Mal Sandon (born 1945), Australian politician
 Viscount Sandon, a courtesy title of the Earl of Harrowby

Given name
 Sandon (philosopher) (1st century BC), Orphic philosopher
 Sandon Berg (born 1971), American film producer, screenwriter and actor
 Sandon Stolle (born 1970), Australian former professional tennis player

Other uses
 Sandon (god), an ancient Hittite deity
 Sandon Dock, a former dock on the River Mersey
 Sandon Dock railway station
 Sandon Half Tide Dock, Merseyside
 Sandon High School, Stoke-on-Trent
 The Sandon School, Chelmsford, Essex

See also
 Sandown (disambiguation)